Apiocrinites (from  , 'pear' and   'to perceive') is an extinct genus of crinoid that lived from the Middle to the Late Jurassic of Asia and Europe.

References

Sources
 William I. Ausich and Mark A. Wilson (2012). "New Tethyan Apiocrinitidae (Crinoidea, Articulata) from the Jurassic of Israel". Journal of Paleontology 86 (6): 1051–1055. doi:10.1666/12-049R.1

External links
Apiocrinites in the Paleobiology Database

Millericrinida
Jurassic crinoids
Prehistoric echinoderms of Asia
Prehistoric echinoderms of Europe
Middle Jurassic first appearances
Late Jurassic extinctions